Khulna Tigers are a franchise Twenty20 cricket team representing the Khulna division in the Bangladesh Premier League (BPL), a Twenty20 cricket tournament. The franchise was owned by Gemcon Sports and was founded in 2016 as a replacement for the Khulna Royal Bengals who had participated in the first two seasons of the BPL. The Titans use Sher-e-Bangla National Cricket Stadium, Sylhet International Cricket Stadium and Zohur Ahmed Chowdhury Stadium for home games.

During the 2016/17 season, the team was captained by Mahmudullah Riyad and was coached by Stuart Law.

For the 2017/18 Bangladesh Premier League season, Mahela Jayawardene was appointed as the head coach replacing Stuart Law who took up duties as the head coach of West Indies cricket team.

On 16 November 2019, MindTree Limited and Premier Bank Limited was named as the sponsor of the team and the team was renamed to Khulna Tigers from Khulna Titans.

History

The Khulna Royal Bengals team was originally formed by Orion Group and participated in the first two seasons of the Bangladesh Premier League in 2011/12 and 2012/13. Following the suspension of all of the BPL franchises following a range of financial and spot-fixing issues during the second season of the league, the original franchise was not re-established for the third season of the BPL in 2015/16.

Season overview

2011/12

Khulna Royal Bengals forged a strong side with the likes of Shakib Al Hasan as captain and some other well known players such as Shivnarine Chanderpaul, Dwayne Smith and Herschelle Gibbs. In the league stage, the team was pretty outstanding, advancing to the playoffs finishing only second to Dhaka Gladiators. However, they lost a cliffhanger to Dhaka in the semi finals, finishing off with a respectable outing

2012/13

After a strong last season, Khulna could not make a team as strong as their previous campaign. This time they have Shahriar Nafees as captain who had Riki Wessels, Shapoor Zadran and more as company. Khulna had a disastrous season this time. Losing 75% of their 12 matches, finishing last at 7th.

2016/17

After a complete change in the franchise ownership and management Khulna Titans were established in advance of the 2016–17 Bangladesh Premier League. They had a stable team with the likes of sume talented Bangladeshi players such as Mahmudullah (icon), Shafiul Islam, Ariful Haque, Mosharraf Hossain. They added 9 overseas to their roster such as Riki Wessels, Junaid Khan, Lendl Simmons, Nicholas Pooran and Andre Fletcher. They were able to get to the playoffs but were defeated by both Rajshahi Kings and Dhaka Dynamites. They ended up second in the team rankings with Junaid Khan as their leading wicket-taker and Mahmudullah as the leading scorer. They won nail-biting encounters against Chittagong Vikings and Rajshahi Kings in the league stage. They finished with being known as 'the team with the best bowling attack' as two of their seamers (Junaid and Shafiul) were in the top 10 most wickets list for the tournament and had a rather disappointing Batting lineup as most batter failed to show their potential other than Ariful and their icon.

2017/18

They re-signed Mahmudullah Riyad as their icon while they also made contracts with South African cricketers Rilee Rossouw, Kyle Abbott, Aussie star Chris Lynn (will miss BPL due to injury), Windies's 2016 ICC World T20 hero Carlos Brathwaite and his national teammate Chadwick Walton. They also signed Englishman Dawid Malan and Lankan all-rounder Seekkuge Prasanna and more. They retained Junaid Khan, Ariful Haque, Shafiul Islam, Mosharraf Hossain Rubel and Benny Howell. Pakistani Wicket-keeper batsman Sarfraz Ahmed, leg spinner Shadab Khan and Junaid will be unavailable for selection on a temporary basis due to domestic commitments.

From the draft, the Titans signed 8 locals (more than minimum of 7) and 2 foreigners. Their first pick was bought Nazmul Hossain Shanto while the surprise picks were U19 skipper Saif Hassan and little-known local pacer Imran Ali and Barbados-born English cricketer Jofra Archer. The interesting thing about Imran is that he took a 5-wicket haul in his second List-A match. They signed Sri Lankan batting all-rounder Shehan Jayasuriya and other locals from the draft.

Khulna Titans had the strong start with a win against Sylhet Sixers. The team was pretty consistent throughout the tournament and finished 3rd in the league stage, hence qualifying to the playoffs. In the eliminator against Rangpur Riders a one-man show from Chris Gayle, who struck an unbeaten 126, blew the Titans away and had them eliminated.

2018/19

Khulna Titans retained Mahmudullah Riyad, Nazmul Hossain Shanto, Ariful Haque and Carlos Brathwaite. They also signed English batsman Dawid Malan and American fast bowler Ali Khan pre-draft.

In the draft, the Titans got the very first pick and signed wicket-keeper batsman Jahurul Islam. Their overseas signings in the draft included veteran seamer Lasith Malinga, leg-spinner Yasir Shah, wicket-keeper batsman Brendan Taylor and more. Some of their domestic picks were Junaid Siddiqui, Subashis Roy, Taijul Islam, the young left-arm seamer Shoriful Islam and more.

2019/20

The franchise had signed former Australian captain and all-rounder Shane Watson and South African leg spinner Imran Tahir as their two direct overseas signings.

However, During the player's direct signing period, a Conflict of Interests aroused between BCB and all other franchise. Subsequently, in September 2019, BCB made some changes in rules and regulations for this season and eliminating all franchises, BCB took over the charge of the current BPL and decided to run this current tournament by the board itself and named the tournament as Bangabandhu BPL T20 2019 in order to pay homage to Sheikh Mujibur Rahman on his birth centenary. Premier Bank Limited became the team sponsor of Khulna. They renamed it to Khulna Tigers. They have signed the likes of Mushfiqur Rahim and Mohammad Amir in the draft.

Current squad

Kit manufacturers and sponsors

References

External links 
 Khulna Titans Website

Bangladesh Premier League teams
Sports clubs in Bangladesh
Cricket in Khulna
Sport in Khulna
2016 establishments in Bangladesh
Cricket clubs established in 2016